Porin may refer to:

 Porin (protein), a transmembrane protein
 Porin (opera), a Croatian grand opera, first performed in 1897
 Porin (music award), Croatian music industry award, first awarded in 1994 and named after the opera